Francis Joseph Murray (February 3, 1911 – March 15, 1996) was a mathematician, known for his foundational work (with John von Neumann) on functional analysis, and what subsequently became known as von Neumann algebras. He received his BA from Columbia College in 1932 and PhD from Columbia University in 1936. He taught at Duke University.

In 1967 he was awarded the Outstanding Civilian Service Medal by the U. S. Army.

Selected publications
 1936 (with J. von Neumann), "On rings of operators," Ann. of Math. 2(37): 116–229. The original paper on von Neumann algebras.
 1937 (with J. von Neumann), "On rings of operators II," Trans. Amer. Math. Soc. 41: 208–248. 
 1943 (with J. von Neumann), "On rings of operators IV," Ann. of Math. 2(44): 716–808. 
 1941. An Introduction to Linear Transformations in Hilbert Space. Annals of Mathematics Studies, no. 4. Princeton Univ. Press.
 1947. The theory of mathematical machines. Columbia Univ. Press.
 1954. (with Kenneth S. Miller). Existence Theorems for Ordinary Differential Equations. ; 2nd printing Krieger 1976; reprint Dover 2013.
 1978. Applied Mathematics: An Intellectual Orientation.

References

A brief obituary.

Retirement of Francis Joseph Murray. Duke Math. J. 47 (1980), no. 4, 983–985.

1911 births
1996 deaths
20th-century American mathematicians
Columbia University faculty
Duke University faculty
Operator theorists
Scientists from New York City
Mathematicians from New York (state)

Columbia College (New York) alumni
Columbia Graduate School of Arts and Sciences alumni